Material take off (MTO) is a term used in engineering and construction, and refers to a list of materials with quantities and types (such as specific grades of steel) that are required to build a designed structure or item. This list is generated by analysis of a blueprint or other design document. The list of required materials for construction is sometimes referred to as the material take off list (MTOL).

Material take off is not limited to the amount of required material, but also the weight of the items taken off. This is important when dealing with larger structures, allowing the company that does the take off to determine total weight of the item and how best to move the item (if necessary) when construction is completed.

Definition used by the ISA (International Society of Automation)
A material take off (MTO) is the process of analyzing the drawings and determining all the materials required to accomplish the design. Thereafter, the material take off is used to create a bill of materials (BOM). Procurement and requisition are activities that occur after the bill of materials is complete, distinct from Inspection.

References
Whitt, Successful Instrument and Control System Design, ISA Press, 2004.

Engineering concepts
The final stages of the MTO is as instrumentally visible in the GAD (General Arrangement Drawing) for specific equipment. The MTO sheet is such an important document in projects as it presents a huge detail such as list of all Materials, quantities, weights, material types, material codes etc.